This is a list of characters appearing in the Japanese fantasy novel series Gate: Jieitai Kano Chi nite, Kaku Tatakaeri, published by Arcadia, and its sequel series Gate Season 2.

Original series

Main characters

The protagonist of the series, Itami is a 33-year-old otaku and JSDF soldier. After successfully escorting hundreds of citizens to safety during the attack on Ginza, Itami is promoted to the rank of first lieutenant and tasked to investigate the world on the other side of the Gate. He is a certified JSDF Ranger and Special Forces trooper (although this only occurred due to his superiors' futile attempts to discipline him), and while he is notable for being a slacker and a fast runner from trouble, he is honest and compassionate and can be quite capable when under stress. He is also later rendered immune to bodily harm due to a contract Rory Mercury makes with him, in exchange for him becoming her servant upon his death. With his heroic acts during the battle of Ginza and in the world beyond the Gate, he also becomes a role model for his fellow JSDF soldiers and his friends in Alnus Town.
Itami's family name is derived from the city of Itami in the Hyōgo Prefecture, where the JGSDF Central Army headquarters is located.

A 19-year-old princess from the Empire that rules the other world. Born to an Imperial concubine, and 10th (3rd in the anime) in the line of succession to the throne, Piña Co Lada is dedicated to the Empire's welfare. Idealistic but inexperienced, she has at first trouble dealing with the realities of political life, but matures during the course of the series. After seeing the JSDF's military power in action, she wishes to establish peace with Japan, as she knows that a war with them will eventually lead to the Empire's ultimate destruction. During her first visit to Japan to meet with several officials, Piña develops an obsession with yaoi dōjinshi and later has her Rose Knights translate more of them for her to read. After being rescued from Zorzal's clutches, Piña is appointed Crown Princess by Emperor Molt and ends up falling in love with Itami. Oddly, her name is taken from the rum-based cocktail Piña colada.

Tuka is a 165-year-old High Elf, an adolescent by her race's standards. She loses her father who sacrifices himself to save her when her village is attacked by a Flame Dragon, and since then travels with Itami and co. However, she has a hard time coping with her father's death, and eventually begins to lapse into insanity, starting to view Itami as her lost father. But even after overcoming her loss with Itami's help, she keeps calling him "father" both out of habit and out of bashfulness about her budding true feelings for him. She has also entertained a temporary crush on Mari Kurokawa.

A 15-year-old mage from the other world, a former member of the Rurudo nomad tribe, and a student to an elderly sorcerer who is notable for her platinum-blonde hair and perpetually emotionless expression. She considers herself legally married to Itami after the latter unwittingly fulfilled an ancient wedding custom, which involves a couple spending three consecutive nights in the same room. Brilliant and inquisitive, Lelei quickly learns the Japanese language and becomes the interpreter/translator for Itami's party. Thanks to the knowledge of physics acquired during her visits to Earth, combined with her natural magical abilities and a gift from the underworld goddess Hardy, she eventually becomes capable of opening a Gate between the Special Region and Japan at will.

A 961-year-old demigoddess and the Apostle of the god Emroy. She's usually dressed in her formal apostle wear, which strongly resembles Gothic Lolita fashion. Rory's status as a demigoddess entails that she cannot die and can recover from any wound; upon her 1,000th birthday, she will ascend and become a full goddess. She's superhumanly strong, which allows her to wield her extremely heavy signature halberd with ease, and very fast and agile, with centuries of combat experience. Her presence and status as an Apostle are also a great help to Itami's group in establishing social relations within the Special Region. Her only major weakness is her fear of going underground, due to her dislike for Hardy, the Special Region's goddess of the underworld who desires Rory as her bride. After meeting Itami, she takes a particular interest in him because of his sincerity, and owing to this affection, she later elects to become the Goddess of Love upon her ascension.

A Dark Elf who is over 300 years old; her middle name is a reference to the underworld goddess Hardy, who is worshipped by her people. She seeks the JSDF's aid when the same dragon that attacked Tuka's village moves to the forest where her tribe lives, becoming a threat to them. Unlike the other three girls in Itami's company, she isn't as relentless in pursuing his affections, but she is just as perplexed about his seemingly indifferent attitude about their relationship, especially since her penchant for bad luck keeps her self-esteem low and she regards Itami as a pillar of support.

Japanese characters

Third Recon Unit
While the Recon Unit encompasses a total of eleven members, the characters listed here are those who gain special prominence in the story.

 A petite but buxom Sergeant First Class of the Third Recon Unit under Itami, she does not hold him in high regard due to his otaku nature. She idolizes the Japanese Rangers and Special Forces; a perception which is somewhat broken when she learns that Itami is a certified member of both. She excels in hand-to-hand combat and prefers charging head-first into a battle to take on her opponents with just her rifle-mounted bayonet. She remains in the Special Region when the Gate is closed, because the new world presents her with a chance to cut loose with her combative nature and because she has fallen in love with her teammate Tomita, despite him being already involved with Bozes of the Rose Knights.

 Sergeant First Class Tomita, a 27-year-old trained Ranger, is the gentle giant of the unit who is a solemn but kind man and often acts as the voice of reason within the group. He and Bozes enter a relationship, and as a result he is one of the JSDF servicemen remaining in the Special Region when the Gate is closed.

 A 21-year-old sergeant in the JSDF and driver on the recon team, he is also an otaku like Itami, with a special fetish for catgirls. His geeky fantasy becomes reality when he meets Persia, a housemaid of the Formal Clan who happens to be half-cat. The two become close very quickly and are nearly inseparable whenever Kurata visits Italica. Owing to this affection, Kuruta is one of the JSDF servicemen who voluntarily stays in the Special Region when the original Gate is shut down.

 The medic of the Third Recon Team with the rank of Sergeant First Class, at 190cm she is an unusually tall woman. Her father is a submarine commander in the Japan Maritime Self-Defense Force. She can be uncomfortably sharp-tongued in her opinions at times, especially to Itami if she suspects he has ulterior motives related to his otaku hobbies. While she cares for the well-being of those under her supervision, especially civilians, she can be very vicious with disobedient patients, often using means of intimidation bordering on sadism to discipline them. At the end of the series, she has returned to Earth and become head nurse of the JSDF Central Hospital.

 A fifty-year-old Sergeant Major who serves as Itami's second in command. As the oldest member in the unit, he has experience and wisdom of training and leading recruits on the field. He replaces Itami as team leader after the latter runs off to kill the Fire Dragon on his own and is consequently relieved of his command. After the original Gate has closed, he retires from the JSDF and works at a security firm while spending time with his newly-born grandchildren.

 A leading private in the Third Recon Team who used to work in his family's first-class restaurant until he got into an argument with the new management, and joined the JSDF to gather the funds to open his own restaurant. During the team's mission in the Imperial Capital, he goes undercover as a chef after his cooking gets the interest of Prince Zorzal. There he falls in love with Tyuule, Zorzal's Warrior Bunny concubine and secret adversary; they end up aiding each other in thwarting the tyrannical prince, and after Tyuule's death and the closure of the Gate, he and Delilah open a restaurant in Tokyo in her memory.

JSDF Special Region Task Force

 A JSDF Lieutenant General in charge of the JSDF task force within the Special Region who holds Itami in high regard despite the latter's reckless attitude. As a responsible commander, he is one of the JSDF servicemen who stays behind when the Gate is shut down.
 

 A First Lieutenant who serves as General Hazama's aide. He dislikes Itami due to the latter gaining his rank due to the Ginza Incident, whereas he had to earn it by hard work himself. Unlike Itami, who cares about the people of the Special Region and wants to help them, Yanagida sees no problem in manipulating and exploiting the Special Region's people and resources for Japan's gain. He eventually develops a grudging respect for Itami despite the fact that the two seem to antagonize each other over minor details, especially regarding Itami's nonchalant attitude and his ability to gain allies so easily.

A major in the Special Region Task Force and Itami's immediate superior, who is usually frustrated by Itami's lax attitude violating military protocol.

A JSDF colonel and commander of the Special Region Task Force's 4th Combat Unit, an air assault company, and a veteran of Italica and the evacuation of the Jade Palace. Despite their age difference and language barrier, he begins a relationship with Rose Knight Beefeater E Caty, and is one of the servicemen remaining in the Special Region after the Gate's collapse.

A colonel and the commander of the 1st Task Force Combat Unit, a mixed infantry corps.

A somewhat hot-blooded lieutenant colonel in the Japanese Air Force, and the leader of the JASDF branch of the Task Force, flying a F4 Phantom. He stays in the Special Region upon the Gate's closure because of the lack of flying restrictions in that world, and because of his romantic attentions towards the Rose Knights.

A major and chief of the JSDF detachment stationed in Akusho, the Imperial Capital's red-light district.

Japanese government and citizens

The Japanese Minister of Defense and Itami's old friend. Like Itami, he is also an otaku. Strong-willed and patriotic, he succeeds Prime Minister Morita as an interim candidate after he and the other Cabinet members expose Morita's cowardice in intending to surrender administration of the Gate to a foreign international conspiracy instead of defending his nation's sovereignty. At the end of the series, he has retired from politics and thus become free to pursue his otaku passions once more.

Itami's ex-wife and a yaoi doujin artist whose hobby of collecting dolls leave her broke quite frequently. Having been former classmates in college, she and Itami married for convenience: Itami provided money for Risa's hobby and Risa looked after the household for Itami. Risa divorced Itami after she tried to convince Itami not to go to the Special Region and realized that he never really loved her. Nevertheless, they still care about each other, with Itami still providing financial support to Risa. Risa still loves Itami, even though she knows he'll never realize it on his own. After encountering Piña, she becomes the princess' main source for doujin mangas.

One of several Japanese civilians who were captured by Imperial Scouts prior to the Ginza Incident. She was taken to the Imperial capital, where she became Prince Zorzal's sex slave. When the Japanese learn of Noriko's existence, the JSDF rescues her and warns the Empire there will be consequences if all other Japanese slaves are not repatriated. Despite her traumatic experience and the loss of her entire family during the Ginza Incident, she returns to Alnus to act as a liaison between the locals and the Japanese media. After witnessing the callous sensationalist pursuits of the Japanese media in the Special Region (especially as personified by Kazunari Komurazaki), she begins to crusade against this bias, determined to serve only the truth to the Japanese public.

Shino's younger sister and a rookie newscaster. After she finds out that the news concerning the Special Region are censored by elements in the Japanese government looking out for their own interests instead of the public's, she dedicates herself to relaying the pure truth about the other world and root out the corruption in the Japanese media. After the closure of the Gate, she establishes a popular online news studio.

A Ministry of Foreign Affairs official who is sent to the Special Region as an ambassador to the Empire as part of a delegation to convince the Empire to seek peace with Japan. When he meets Sherry Tyueri and she falls in love with him, he is quite awkward about her affection for him considering her tender age, but genuinely cares about her. When Zorzal takes over the throne and his Oprichnina arrests members of the nobility who seek peace with Japan, he saves Sherry by declaring that she is his fiancé. Before the Gate is closed, he decides to remain in the Special Region to maintain the diplomatic ties between Japan and the Empire.

The Vice Minister of Foreign Affairs in charge of the Special Region.

A leading member of the Japanese Defense Intelligence Headquarters and later of the Public Security Division, who acts as a guide and head of personal security during the official visits of Itami's troupe in Japan. Later he proves instrumental in deposing Prime Minister Morita for conspiracy against Japan's national interests and installing Minister Kanō as an interim candidate in his place.

An extremely arrogant, superficial Japanese journalist who constantly tries to score negative press about the JSDF in the Special Region solely for publicity's sake. His selfishness and recklessness endanger and even cause the death of some of his support personnel in his sensationalist pursuits, making him very unpopular with the Japanese on-site.

A female 21-year-old Japanese police officer who gets involved in the Ginza Incident in Gate: Zero. While seen as strong-willed and dependable on the outside, she is actually clumsy, timid, and naive.

A 5-year-old girl who gets entangled in the attack on Ginza in Gate: Zero. She is based on an original character - a child Itami takes care of in the Incident's aftermath - from the first episode of the anime series.

Special Region characters

The Empire
The Empire has at the time of the JSDF's arrival remained the dominant political domain in the Special Region for over 687 years. Its political, cultural and military systems are patterned after those of the ancient Roman Empire. Humans form the primary social class; demihumans are by Imperial law considered non-citizens.

First Prince of the Empire, Piña's eldest half-brother, and the main antagonist of the series. Mentally unstable, arrogant and vain, yet cunning enough to play the role of a foolish upstart (for his father to believe that he could be easily used as a proxy once he retires), Zorzal is a sadist who enjoys committing rape, murder and genocide, and owns a number of sex slaves. After Itami frees his Japanese prisoner Noriko from his clutches, Zorzal swears revenge, installs himself as the new Emperor, and attempts to wage a new war against Japan, heedless of the JSDF's technological superiority. In the end, after a reckless all-out attack on Piña before the gates of Italica, he loses all and is killed by Tyuule, although he succeeds in taking her with him.

Zorzal's sex slave and the former Queen of the Warrior Bunny Tribe. Her tribe was at war with the Empire, but realizing they could not win, she gave herself up to Prince Zorzal as his slave in exchange for him sparing her tribe. However, Zorzal did not keep his word and brutally slaughtered and enslaved her people while lying to the survivors that Tyuule sold them out to save herself, which gained her her tribe's hatred. Upon learning the truth, Tyuule swore revenge to bring down the Empire by appearing submissive to Zorzal while secretly manipulating him into waging a suicidal war with Japan that would bring the Empire to complete ruin. She falls in love with Furuta Hitoshi, but in the end cannot let go of her vengeance against Zorzal, and when she is found out, she and the prince end up killing each other.

The Special Region's ruthlessly calculating Emperor and Piña's father. Despite knowing that the Japanese forces far outclass the Empire's, he is initially reluctant to seek peace with them, fearing that they might be truly unstoppable should he give them time to establish a foothold. After being rescued from Zorzal's clutches, and after realizing that the JSDF are his best hope for preserving the Empire, he allies himself with them and appoints Piña as his rightful successor.

The king of Elbe Kingdom, Duran was part of the second wave of forces sent by the Empire to recapture Alnus hill from the JSDF "invaders". His forces were annihilated, and when Princess Piña found him, he was a crippled shell of a man waiting for his death, either from the Empire or his own people. Later on, he secretly poses as a disabled refugee at Alnus and is rehabilitated by the JSDF with prosthetic limbs and medical treatment. He later serves as a pivotal person in allowing the JSDF to cross the Elbe kingdom and help Itami defeat the Fire Dragon, and as a member of the pro-Imperial coalition against Zorzal.

A former founding member of the Order of the Rose Knights, who after leaving the group became a viscount. He participated in and was captured during the Imperial attack on Ginza, and seeking to repay Japan for his humiliation, he becomes one of Zorzal's military advisors during the Imperial civil war. His main ambition is to prove himself Piña's better, a prospect in which he fails when he is unceremoniously captured after the Second Battle of Italica.

The ambitious but cowardly younger brother of Zorzal who seeks the throne despite not being next in the line of succession. When Zorzal takes over, he flees to Alnus in order to enlist a foreign power in aiding his ascension, resulting in him entering a deal with the Chinese government to make him the Emperor in return for delivering Lelei to them. However, after the Chinese betray him, Rory Mercury appoints him as the nominal "puppet" governor of the Alnus Living Community to satisfy his ambitions.

Sherry is the 12-year-old daughter of the Tyueri family, a noble family related to Marquess Casel, an influential senator. Wanting to improve his connections to Casel, Sugawara offered to have a pearl necklace delivered to Sherry following their meeting at a party. Following this, Sherry fell in love with Sugawara, and attempted to pursue him whenever he was near. She quickly demonstrates a wisdom and maturity beyond her years, showing a keen understanding of the awkward interactions between Japan and the people of the Empire, as well as the problems this would pose to Japan and her "future husband"; for this reason, she eagerly offers to aid Sugawara and help bridge the gap between their nations. After her parents' death during Zorzal's purge of the Imperial pro-peace factions, Marquess Casel adopts Sherry as his ward, and Emperor Molt later appoints her as his emissary in Japan, a role which she fulfills with uncanny capability. When the Gate is closed, she moves in with Sugawara's family to await the reunion of the two worlds.

The Empire's Minister of Internal Affairs, and chief adviser and right hand of Emperor Molt Augustus. In some translations his name is spelled "Marx".

Order of the Rose Knights
The Order of the Rose Knights, founded and led by Imperial Princess Piña Co Lada, consists of a predominantly female group of noble women from the Empire. Originally, they served as color guard and "decorative" pieces for the Empire's Army and were never used in battle. Their first actual battle came at the Siege of Italica, where rogue Allied Soldiers became marauders and attacked the merchant city, an event where the Knights demonstrated their skills and loyalty to the Empire and their princess.

A commoner by birth and a veteran Imperial knight assigned under Princess Piña who also served as the Rose Knights' mentor and combat instructor.

Princess Piña's page, who is two years her junior. She was part of Princess Pina's group during the Siege of Italica and assisted Piña in making a treaty with the JDSF. After her own interaction with the JDSF, she feels reliable, dependable, and trustful towards the actions and words of Itami and his 3rd Recon Team.

Second daughter of Marquis Palesti, and second in command of Princess Piña's order of Knights; given the title of the Gold Rose. She develops mutually shared feelings for Tomita, formalizes a forbidden relationship with him and becomes pregnant with his child, Mai.

A member of the Order, as well as a close friend of Princess Piña. Her later love affair with Piña's brother Diabo makes her both his reluctant accomplice and a moderating influence in his own ascension plans.

A captain of the Rose Knights and one of Princess Piña's oldest acquaintances. She later enters into a relationship with Colonel Kengun of the 401st Company, who led the Jade Palace rescue. It wasn't clear if author Takumi Yanai based her character name "Beefeater" on the Yeoman Warders, who are also called "Beefeaters", or on a popular Gin brand that also goes by the same name. In the English Dub, her name is revised from Beefeater to Vivita.

A young Imperial noble who is part of the Order of the Rose Knights. Shandy has a weakness for famous people, and tends to romanticize owing to her enthusiasm. She is the one who originally reports the Flame Dragon's defeat to the Empire, and later assists Itami and his group guarding Leilei from assassins during her Master Exam. During the Imperial civil war, she is killed in the Second Battle of Italica after being overwhelmed by Haryo tribe assassins while defending Emperor Molt.

Clan Formal
Clan Formal is a neutral clan that resides in the city of Italica, an important agricultural town. The former patriarch was Count Colt Formal, a nobleman who took in many poor residents and humanoids as servants and as a personal "hobby". The maids are also skilled in combat in case the household is threatened. With the founding of the Alnus settlement, several of the Formal household servants move there to aid the JSDF as public workers (shopkeepers, barmaids, etc.). After the failure of Zorzal's coup d'état and the rescue of Princess Piña and Emperor Molt, Italica becomes the temporary seat of the legitimate Imperial government.

The third and (at 11 years) youngest daughter of Colt Formal and his wife, who perished in an accident, and his heir and nominal leader of the Formal household.

The de facto guardian of Countess Myui and head of the female household servants. While she dislikes the Empire because it subjugated her homeland by force, she is a gracious host and trustworthy ally. Her primary interest is the protection of the Countess, though, which initially drives her into employing her household servants as spies against the JSDF in order to discern their ultimate motives.

A Warrior Bunny maid and spy for Clan Formal at the Alnus Community. A proud warrior of her people, she refused to subjugate herself to slavery after Zorzal captured her queen Tyuule, whom she wants to kill due to Zorzal's lies. She and other fugitives from her people were eventually taken in by Count Formal. After she is tricked by Tyuule, Bouro and a traitor within House Formal into attempting to murder Noriko, she opens a relationship with Akira Yanagida and joins the Japanese Special Forces in their forays against Zorzal's forces during the Imperial civil war. After the war's conclusion, she moves to Japan before the Gate's closure and together with Furuta opens a restaurant dedicated to Tyuule's memory.

A young catgirl maid from House Formal who has taken up work at the Alnus settlement's PX shop.

A pince-nez-wearing catgirl maid who becomes romantically involved with Kurata.

A Warrior Bunny maid.

A Medusa maid at House Formal. Unlike her mythological template, she is very pretty and does not turn people to stone, but rather drains their life energy and memories. She was hired by the late Count to ease the passing of dying house members into the afterlife.

Deities
The Special Region is home to several deities - both full-fledged gods and demigods - who act as guardians against undesired developments amongst the other world's people, either by sponsoring those who promote the natural balance or by eradicating any elements which threaten it. Demigods, also called Apostles, are first selected from among mortal beings with great potential; they maintain a physical form, but remain eternally young and alive even after suffering dismemberment, until they become spiritual beings and ascend to godhood upon their 1,000th year. These newly ascended gods are free to claim one of the domains held by the deity they served, or any aspect not yet claimed by another deity, or become a specific region's divine patron. Many denizens of the Special Region base their middle names on the name of the deity they personally worship.

The Goddess of the Underworld in the Special Region, whose main temple is located in the city of Belnago. The uniforms of her priestesses are similar to Rory Mercury's clothes in a lolita-type fashion, except that they are colored white. Hardy is very whimsical and likes to act upon her own desires; she is also a lesbian, and would like to claim Rory as her bride. As an incorporeal being, she can only directly interact with the mortal world if she takes possession of someone's body. She is also responsible for opening the original gateway to Earth in order to see the Empire plunged into chaos and enable a new beginning, and for awakening the Flame Dragon to destroy the Gate; a plan which was foiled when Itami killed the monster.

Giselle is a member of the dragon folk, the youngest of the Twelve Apostles in the Special Region (at an age of just over 400 years), and Hardy's personal servant. She considers herself a rival to Rory Mercury and is responsible for waking the Flame Dragon in Hardy's name. Upon her mistress' orders, she later ends up aiding the JSDF against Zorzal's forces and the cataclysmic effects of the Gate's continued existence.

Mentioned often but never seen, the God of Darkness, War, Violence, and Death is commonly represented by his Apostle, Rory Mercury. Under his doctrine, killing is not considered a sin, though the reason behind any killing determines the judgement which the perpetrators receive from Emroy. The souls of those who fall bravely in battle are drawn into Emroy's domain to serve him; most other souls are instead left for Hardy to claim.
 and 
The Twin Gods of Knowledge and Learning, who founded the city of Rondel during their Apostle period.

The Special Region's God of Music.

The Special Region's Goddess of Fertility and Birth, responsible for good harvests and safe childbirths. While popular in this regard, her worshippers must at least once in their lives work as temple prostitutes to fulfill their obligations to her.

Sages of Rondel
Rondel is a university city for studies in magic, natural science and history. It was founded by Elran and La over 3,000 years ago, and has produced a great number of renowned magicians and sages since that time. Next to Italica and the settlement at Alnus, it is also one of the few places within the Empire where demihumans enjoy the same basic rights as human beings.

A magician who took in Lelei as his second disciple in magic. A slightly eccentric character, he moved away from Rondel to settle at the outskirts of Coda village, where he and Lelei first met the JSDF. In spite of his lecherous sense of humour, he plays a fatherly role for the refugees evacuated to Alnus by Itami; many in Rondel regard him as one of the strongest mages. In the anime series, however, he is reduced to the role of an oddball side character.

Lelei's 24-year-old stepsister. She mainly focuses on alchemy and more specifically the study of minerals. This field is quite expensive in her world and receives little funding, causing her to live a life of poverty. To compensate for this, she works to create copies of books by hand (as the printing press wasn't invented in the Special Region), but the stress of her current lifestyle leaves her prone to violent fits of hysteria. And while she deeply cares about Lelei, Arpeggio feels jealous about how Lelei continually outachieves her and thus puts her authority as older sibling in question, and as a result of that the two sisters oftentimes end up quarreling. Owing to this volatile temper, Arpeggio is commonly nicknamed "Iron Alfie" by her peers.

An elderly human sage specializing in natural history, and Arpeggio's mentor, who upon an assignment by Rory Mercury discovered the importance of the Gate to the Special Region races' collective history. She is very friendly and a happy person, but unappropiately girlish for her age and quite accident-prone.

A young Elven research sage (sages not using arcane magic) specializing in astronomy, and the only one of his kind pursuing an academic career. He has a crush on Arpeggio, who is both flattered and embarrassed by his attentions and gentle manner. He does not appear in the anime.

Other residents

A male High Elf and Tuka's father, who was apparently killed by the Flame Dragon destroying their village while saving his daughter's life. However, it is later found out that he is still alive, if amnesic, and under the care of the Rurudo nomads, Lelei's ethnic tribe, where he has built up a harem and sired a half-blood daughter.

A beast-man who is the leader of the Haryo, a tribe consisting of demihuman mixed-bloods who consider themselves the true rulers of the Special Region. In his ambition to infiltrate and eventually gain control of the Empire for his tribe, he allies himself with Tyuule, who he lusts after, but later betrays her to Zorzal and is killed by Tyuule for his treachery.

Her natural form is that of a beast-woman, but she is able to radically change her appearance, sex and voice. While she is a capable fighter, she prefers to kill her victims through proxies, whom she influences psychologically until they are "convinced" that Norra's targets need to die for some "transgression". She dies during the second battle of Italica when she is shot by Kōji Sugawara before she can assassinate Emperor Molt.

A female avian (Winged Woman) who works as a prostitute in the Imperial Capital's red light district Akusho. After the JSDF establishes a secret base in that area, she becomes the spokeswoman of the local demihuman prostitutes and their liaison with the SDF, particularly Mari Kurokawa, for medical treatment. In the novel and manga series, she becomes interested in Lt. Kenzaki, a Special Forces soldier stationed at the Imperial Capital outpost. Following Zorzal's takeover and the subsequent lockdown of the capital, she and the other demihumans forsake their former profession and get wealthy on smuggling much-needed food supplies past the blockade.

A Siren, she was once a member of the bandit army that attacked Italica before being captured by the JSDF. After her discharge from prison, she became a member of the local military police at the Alnus Living Community, usually as Rory Mercury's partner.

Wolf, a guard working at the Alnus Living Community, is a member of the Volralden, a wolfman tribe originating from beyond the Ice and Snow Mountains northeast of Alnus who traditionally hire themselves out as mercenaries. A background character in the novel series, he chiefly appears in humorous side stories within the manga.

The proprietor of the Alnus Town café who - chiefly out of worry for his livelihood once the Gate is closed - becomes one of Diabo's accomplices in kidnapping Lelei for the prince's bid for power.

The chief of Coda village who is rescued by Itami and the 3rd Recon Team from the Flame Dragon. Later on he bears witness to the first atrocities committed by Zorzal's forces and the Haryo tribe against the Empire's civilian population, whereupon he is once again saved by Itami and his entourage and finds refuge in the Imperial capital. (The latter plot point is skipped in the anime series, where the chief inexplicably appears again in Itami's company, thanking Itami for saving him once more.)

Other characters from Earth

The President of the United States. An opportunist, he seeks to lay claim to and strip the Special Region of its natural resources, comparing it with the frontier of old. He becomes a member of an international coalition to deprive Japan of its monopoly to the Gate, but after the Chinese betray them, he restores his good standing with the Japanese by sending commandos to snatch Lelei from their clutches.

The President of the People's Republic of China. His main intention is to use the Special Region as a colony to relieve his country's population problem. When he is contacted by Diabo and offered Lelei in return for making him Emperor, he turns against the secret coalition which has formed to deny Japan the monopolization of the Gate, and later against Diabo as well, to secure the exclusive access to the Special Region for his own.

The President of the Russian Federation. Although he would like to profit from being able to tap into the Special Region, he is mainly concerned with the result the continued existence of the Gate could have on his country's economy, as the resources claimed from there would impair Russia's export revenues.

Gate Season 2 characters

Main characters

A Chief Petty Officer in the Japan Maritime Self-Defense Force.

A princess from the Special Region kingdom Tinae.

Japanese characters

Maritime Self-Defense Forces

A JMSDF captain of the Oyashio-class submarine Kitsashio and Tokuhima's commanding officer.

Special Region characters

Tinae

The female pirate captain of the Arch and a friend of Princess Primera.

A female winged demihuman and friend of Princess Primera.

A member of Tinae's Council of Ten, and an ambitious politician.

A female member of the Lenon demihuman tribe, and Shamrock's secretary, Her most distinguishable racial trait is a third eye on her forehead.

A captain candidate for the Tinaen warship Ordell.

References

External links
Gate Season 1 and Gate Season 2 characters in alphapolis.com (Japanese)

Gate (novel series)